The Journal of Public Health Management & Practice (JPHMP) is a bimonthly peer-reviewed public health journal published by Wolters Kluwer, which was established in 1995. The editor-in-chief is Lloyd F. Novick and the associate editor is Justin B. Moore. According to the Journal Citation Reports, the journal has a 2015 impact factor of 1.510.

The journal publishes articles which cover a diverse range of population health topics, with information on public health practice and research. These topics include research to practice, emergency preparedness, bioterrorism, infectious disease surveillance, environmental health, community health assessment, chronic disease prevention and health promotion, and academic-practice linkages. Aside from the main journal issue, JPHMP also publishes a number of peer-reviewed special supplements and/or special topical sections that are sponsored by organizations interested in promoting their work.

Editors 
The journal's editor-in-chief is Lloyd F. Novick and the associate editor is Justin B. Moore. There are a few consulting editors for various health topics, including Public Health Ethics, Environmental & Occupational Health, Human Subjects Protection, Community-Based Practice, Biostatistics, and Infectious Diseases.

References

External links

JPHMP Blog

Public health journals
Lippincott Williams & Wilkins academic journals
Bimonthly journals
Publications established in 1995
English-language journals